Wikstroemia linearifolia is a shrub in the family Thymelaeaceae.  It is native to China, specifically Sichuan.

Description
The shrub grows from 0.6 to 0.8 m tall. Its branches grow densely and are grey or pale yellow in color. Its flowers and berries are yellow. It can be found on rocky slopes at altitudes of 2800 to 3300 m.

References

linearifolia